Volya Movement is a right-wing populist political party in Bulgaria. Before 2016, it was known variously as Today and Liberal Alliance. The party was established by Bulgarian businessman Veselin Mareshki, ostensibly on principles of anti-corruption and anti-elitism.

History

Volya was originally founded by Veselin Mareshki on July 15, 2007, under the name Liberal Alliance.  Following a brief stint as the Dnes party, the name was changed on November 28, 2016, to Volya.

In the 2017 Bulgarian parliamentary elections, Volya won 12 seats in the National Assembly. After negotiations, Volya agreed to support a coalition government between GERB and United Patriots.

In 2018, Volya joined the Movement for a Europe of Nations and Freedom, now referred to as the Identity and Democracy Party. The European political party organizes nationalist parties across Europe and includes the French National Rally, Italian League, and Freedom Party of Austria.

Volya took part in the 2019 European Parliament election in Bulgaria as a member of the Volya-The Bulgarian Patriots coalition. The coalition also included the Agrarian Union "Aleksandar Stamboliyski", the People's Party for Freedom and Dignity, and the United Social Democrats. Mareshki topped the coalition list and stated he would decide whether to keep his seat if elected. The coalition hoped to gain two seats but failed to gain any, finishing in 6th place.

Ahead of the second 2021 Bulgarian parliamentary election, Volya formed an electoral alliance with the National Front for the Salvation of Bulgaria. and the IMRO – Bulgarian National Movement.

Political views
The Volya party advocates populist and reform policies, promoting patriotism, strict immigration controls, friendlier relations with Moscow, and the need to "sweep away the garbage" of a corrupt political establishment. Volya advocates for Bulgarian withdrawal from NATO, which it views as being economically draining on the Bulgarian people whilst providing no benefits to national security. Despite Veselin Mareshki's calls for a "strong united Europe," the party has been described as generally Eurosceptic.

The Volya party supports promoting business in Bulgaria, with Mareshki stating, "Small and medium businesses are also in our focus. We want less bureaucracy, more opportunities for development, more investment, and job creation. There must be strong support from the state, not limitations." The party recognizes Bulgaria's decreasing birth rate, but it opposes increasing immigration into Bulgaria, favoring instead state programs that will promote young families to have more children.

Election results

Statistics

References

Political parties established in 2007
2007 establishments in Bulgaria
Nationalist parties in Bulgaria
Right-wing populist parties
Right-wing populism in Bulgaria
Member parties of the Identity and Democracy Party
Right-wing parties in Europe